The first season of the Brazilian competitive reality television series No Limite, based on the international reality game show franchise Survivor, premiered on Sunday, July 23, 2000 at  (BRT / AMT) on TV Globo.

Twelve contestants were chosen by the producers to participate the show in July 2000. The two initial tribes were Sol (Sun) and Lua (Moon). On episode 6, the two teams merged into a tribe called Solua, named for a combination of two tribes.

On the season finale, the second-to-last immunity challenge divided the players in two teams. The winning team (Elaine and Pipa) advanced for the finals, while the losing team (Andréa and Juliana) was automatically eliminated.

The final two faced off for the final immunity challenge, which was an extremely grueling, multi-part challenge, and the most elaborate challenge of the entire season, often combining elements from previous challenges.

This season creates the first ever all-female final two, with all the final four contestants being women. This fact was repeated only eight years later in Survivor: Micronesia.

The winner was 35-year-old Elaine de Melo, a hairdresser from São Paulo, São Paulo. She defeated graphic producer Patrícia "Pipa" Diniz at the final challenge and took home the R$300.000 prize. The final result was leaked on August 16, 2000, by the brazilian newspaper Extra (also owned by Grupo Globo).

Contestants

Season summary

Voting history

Ratings and reception

Brazilian ratings
All numbers are in points and provided by Kantar Ibope Media.

References

External links
 No Limite – 1ª edição (2000) on MemóriaGlobo.com

2000 Brazilian television seasons
No Limite 1